Pedro Antonio Herrera Moreno (born 7 October 1986), is a Colombian cyclist, who currently rides for amateur team EBSA–Indeportes Boyacá.

Major results
2009
 3rd Overall Vuelta a Chiriquí
2013
 1st Prologue & Stage 3 Vuelta a Cundinamarca
 1st Stage 4 Clásica Ciudad de Girardot
2014
 1st  Time trial, Pan American Road Championships
 1st  Time trial, National Road Championships
 1st Stage 10 Vuelta al Táchira
 8th Overall Vuelta Independencia Nacional

References

External links
 

1986 births
Living people
Colombian male cyclists
People from Tunja
Sportspeople from Boyacá Department
21st-century Colombian people